Zharabad may refer to:
 Zharabad, Urmia
 Zharabad, Silvaneh, Urmia County